¡Ámame! (Love Me) is the title of the 1989 studio album released by the Puerto Rican salsa band, El Gran Combo de Puerto Rico. The album became the group's fifth #1 album to top the Billboard Tropical Albums chart.

Track listing
This information adapted from Allmusic.

Chart performance

See also
List of number-one Billboard Tropical Albums from the 1980s

References

1989 albums
El Gran Combo de Puerto Rico albums